Cystodium may refer to:

 Cystodium (plant), a genus of ferns
 Cystodium (fungus), a genus of fungi